The cuisine of New York City comprises many cuisines belonging to various ethnic groups that have entered the United States through the city. Almost all ethnic cuisines are well represented in New York, both within and outside the various ethnic neighborhoods.

New York was also the founding city of New York Restaurant Week which has spread around the world due to the discounted prices that such a deal offers. In New York there are over 12,000 bodegas, delis, and groceries, and many among them are open 24 hours a day, 7 days a week.

Food identified with New York

Food associated with or popularized in New York

 Hot dogs—served with sauerkraut, sweet relish, onion sauce, or mustard.

 Manhattan clam chowder
 New York-style cheesecake
 New York-style pizza
 New York-style bagel
 New York-style pastrami
 Corned beef
 Baked pretzels
 New York-style Italian ice
 Sausage and peppers
 Knish
 Eggs Benedict
 Chopped cheese
 Lobster Newberg
 Waldorf salad
 Doughnuts
 Delmonico steak
 Black and white cookie
 Bacon, egg and cheese sandwich on a roll

Ashkenazi Jewish cuisine

Much of the cuisine usually associated with New York stems in part from its large community of Ashkenazi Jews and their descendants.

The world-famous New York institution of the delicatessen, commonly referred to as a "deli," was originally an institution of the city's Jewry. Much of New York's Jewish fare has become popular around the globe, especially bagels. (New York City's Jewish community is also famously fond of Chinese food, and many members of this community think of it as their second ethnic cuisine.)

 Bagel and cream cheese
 Bialy
 Blintzes
 Brisket
 Celery soda 
 Challah bread
 Chopped chicken liver
 Corned beef
 Cream cheese
 Egg cream
 Gefilte fish
 Kishka
 Knish
 Lokshen soup
 Matzo
 Matzo ball soup
 New York-style bagels and lox (see also: appetizing)
 New York-style pastrami, pastrami on rye
 Potato kugel
 Potato pancake
 Pickled cucumbers (especially dill pickles)
 Tongue
 Whitefish with and without pike

Italian-American cuisine
A large part of the cuisine associated with New York stems from its large community of Italian-Americans and their descendants. Much of New York's Italian fare has become popular around the globe, especially New York-style pizza.
 Arancini
 Cannoli
 Cappuccino
 Chicken parmigiana
 Espresso
 Fried calamari
 Italian bread
 Italian ice/Granita
 New York-style Italian ice
 New York-style pizza
 Pani câ meusa
 Pasta primavera
 Penne alla vodka
 Rainbow cookies
 Sausage and peppers
 Sfogliatella
 Sicilian bread
 Sicilian style pizza
 Spaghetti and meatballs

Chino-Latino cuisine

Chino-Latino cuisine in New York is primarily associated with the immigration of Chinese Cubans following the Cuban Revolution. Chino-Latino dishes include:

 Chicken and broccoli
 Cuban chicharrones de pollo
 Egg drop soup
 Fried pork chop
 Fried rice
 Lumpiang Shanghai
 Oxtail stew
 Sesame chicken
 White rice with black beans and churrasco

Dishes invented or claimed to have been invented in New York

 Beef Negimaki
 Bloody Mary
 Chef salad
 Chicken à la King
 Chicken and waffles
 Chicken divan
 Cronut
 Delmonico steak
 Egg cream
 Eggs Benedict
 General Tso's chicken
 Ice cream cone
 Lobster Newburg
 Mallomars
 Manhattan
 Manhattan special—a type of carbonated espresso drink.
 Pasta primavera
 Penne alla vodka
 Reuben sandwich
 Sausage and peppers
 Steak Diane
 Spaghetti and meatballs
 Vichyssoise
 Waldorf salad

Street food

 Arepas
 Calzones
 Chinese kebabs (chuanr)
 Churros
 Corndogs
 Cuchifritos
 Dumplings
 Falafel
 Fried chicken
 Fried noodles
 Gray's Papaya, Papaya King—combined papaya juice/hot dog stands
 Grilled chestnuts
 Gyros/Shawarma
 Halal cart chicken/lamb over rice
 Hamburgers
 Honey-roasted peanuts, almonds, cashews, and coconut
 Hot dog stands
 Italian ice
 Italian sausage, bratwurst
 Knishes
 Mister Softee ice cream
 Muffins
 Nutcrackers, illicit alcoholic drinks
 Piragua
 Pizza, especially New York-style pizza
 Soft pretzels
 Souvlaki/Shish kebab
 Stromboli
 Tacos
 Take-out soup, as Soup Kitchen International

Enclaves reflecting national cuisines

The Bronx 

Bedford Park—Mexican, Puerto Rican, Dominican, Korean (on 204th St.)
Belmont—Italian, Albanian (also known as "Arthur Avenue," "Little Italy")
City Island—Italian, seafood
Morris Park—Italian, Albanian
Norwood—Filipino (formerly Irish, less so today)
Riverdale—Jewish
South Bronx—Puerto Rican, Dominican
Wakefield—Jamaican, West Indian
Woodlawn—Irish

Queens 

Astoria—Greek, Italian, Eastern-European, Brazilian, Egyptian and other Arabic
Bellerose—Indian and Pakistani
Elmhurst—Chinese, Indonesian, Thai, Malaysian, Vietnamese
Flushing—Chinese and Korean 
Forest Hills, Kew Gardens Hills, Rego Park—Jewish, Russian and Uzbek
Howard Beach, Ozone Park—Italian
Glendale—German and Polish
Jackson Heights—Indian, Pakistani, Bangladeshi, Colombian, Ecuadorian, Peruvian, Korean, Filipino, Thai, Tibetan, Bhutanese, Mexican
Jamaica—Bangladeshi, Caribbean, African-American, African, Creole
Little Neck—Arab, Chinese, Italian
Richmond Hill; South Ozone Park—Indian, Guyanese, Trinidadian, Pakistani, Bangladeshi
The Rockaways—Irish, Jewish
Woodhaven—Irish, Dominican, Mexican, Guyanese
Woodside; Sunnyside—Filipino, Irish, Mexican, Tibetan, Romanian

Brooklyn 

Bay Ridge—Irish, Italian, Greek, Turkish, Lebanese, Palestinian, Yemeni and other Arabic
Bedford-Stuyvesant—African-American, Jamaican, Trinidadian, Puerto Rican and West Indian
Bensonhurst—Italian, Chinese, Turkish, Russian, Mexican, Uzbek
Borough Park—Jewish, Italian, Mexican, Chinese
Brighton Beach—Russian, Georgian, Turkish, Pakistani and Ukrainian
Bushwick—Puerto Rican, Mexican, Dominican, and Ecuadorian
Canarsie—Jamaican, West Indian, African-American
Carroll Gardens—Italian
Crown Heights—Jamaican, West Indian, and Jewish
East New York—African-American, Dominican, and Puerto Rican
Flatbush—Jamaican, Haitian, and Creole
Greenpoint—Polish and Ukrainian
Kensington—Bengali, Pakistani, Mexican, Uzbek, and Polish
Midwood—Jewish, Italian, Russian, and Pakistani
Park Slope—Italian, Irish, French, and Puerto Rican (formerly)
Red Hook—Puerto Rican, African-American, and Italian
Sheepshead Bay—Seafood, Chinese, Russian, and Italian
Sunset Park—Puerto Rican, Chinese, Arab, Mexican and Italian
Williamsburg—Italian, Jewish, Dominican and Puerto Rican

Staten Island 
Port Richmond—Mexican, Indian, Italian
Rossville; South Beach; Great Kills—Italian, Russian, Arab and Polish
Tompkinsville—Italian, Sri Lankan, Pakistani, Indian

Manhattan 

Chinatown—Chinese and Vietnamese
East Harlem—Puerto Rican, Mexican, Dominican, Chinese-Cuban and Italian
East Village—Japanese, Korean, Indian and Ukrainian
Greenwich Village—Italian and Middle Eastern
Harlem—Italian, African-American, Latin American, West Indian, and West African
Koreatown—Korean
Nolita—Australian
Little Italy—Italian
Lower East Side—Puerto Rican, Jewish, Italian, and Latin American
Murray Hill—Indian, Pakistani and Bangladeshi
Upper West Side, Manhattan—Jewish, Chinese-Latino
Washington Heights—Dominican, Puerto Rican, Mexican and Jewish
Upper East Side—German, Czech, Hungarian

Notable food and beverage companies

 A&P
 AriZona Beverage Company
 Balducci's
 Bamonte's
 Benihana
 Blimpie
 C-Town Supermarkets
 Caffe Reggio—first espresso bar to introduce cappuccino in America
 Carnegie Deli
 Carvel (restaurant)
 Clinton St. Baking Company & Restaurant
 Dean & DeLuca
 Dr. Brown's—sodas
 Drake's Cakes—cakes, pies, pastries
 Domino Foods
 Entenmann's—cakes, pies, pastries
 Fairway Market
 Ferrara Bakery and Cafe—first Italian cafe in America
 Food Network—cable-TV channel
 Fox's U-bet
 Fraunces Tavern—George Washington said goodbye to his troops here. Some departments of his new federal government were originally located here.
 Golden Krust Caribbean Bakery & Grill
 Gray's Papaya—hot dog institution where there is always a "recession special"
 Grotta Azzurra
 Grimaldi's Pizzeria
 Häagen-Dazs
 Hebrew National
 Junior's—"The World's Most Fabulous Cheesecake"
 Katz's Deli
 Kesté
 Key Food—supermarket
 L&B Spumoni Gardens
 Lindy's
 Lombardi's—first pizzeria in America
 Nathan's
 Now and Later—candy
 Papaya King
 PepsiCo, Inc.
 Peter Luger Steak House
 Ray's Pizza—a fierce debate over which was the original
 Russian Tea Room
 Second Avenue Deli
 Serendipity 3
 Sbarro
 Shake Shack
 Snapple
 Stella D'oro—biscuits, cookies
 T.G.I. Friday's—originally a NYC bar
 Totonno's—first pizzeria in Brooklyn
 The Halal Guys
 Vitamin Water
 Yoo-hoo—chocolate drink
 Zabar's

See also

 Cuisine of New Jersey
 Regional cuisine
 List of American foods

References

Further reading
 Baics, Gergely. Feeding Gotham: The Political Economy and Geography of Food in New York, 1790–1860 (Princeton UP, 2016) xviii, 347 pp.
 

 Sietsema, Robert. "10 Iconic Foods of New York City, and Where To Find Them ." Village Voice. Friday February 17, 2012.

External links

New York Food Anywhere
Who Cooked That Up?
New York Gastronomic & Cultural Food Tours
Explore Manhattan's Unique Neighborhoods and Foods
The Best Of Brooklyn Multicultural Ethnic Neighborhood Food Tasting and Culture Tour
Find NYC street food vendors
Great Eating In Flushing